Lamazan (also Romanized as Lamazān and Lemazān) is a city in Mehran Rural District, in the Central District of Bandar Lengeh County, Hormozgan Province, Iran. At the 2006 census, its population was 2,101, in 405 families.

References 

Populated places in Bandar Lengeh County
Cities in Hormozgan Province